Urdu 1 is a 24-hour Urdu language television network, owned by Alliance Media FZ LLC, which is based in Dubai, United Arab Emirates. The channel's transmission became available in Pakistan on 12 June 2012, with regular transmission beginning 23 June 2012. The channel is best-known for its Turkish drama Ishq-e-Mamnu which has millions viewership on its first episode.

Programming

Film production
Urdu 1 started producing films in 2016 under the banner of Urdu 1 Productions.
 Actor In Law (2016)
 Ek Thi Marium (2016)
 Mehrunisa V Lub U (2017)
 Na Maloom Afraad 2 (2017)
 Salute (2016)

See also
List of television channels in Pakistan

References

External links

 
Television networks in Pakistan
Television stations in Pakistan
Urdu-language television channels
Television channels and stations established in 2012
Television stations in Karachi